The panther chameleon (Furcifer pardalis) is a species of chameleon found in the eastern and northern parts of Madagascar in a tropical forest biome. Additionally, it has been introduced to Réunion and Mauritius.

Taxonomy
The Nosy Be panther chameleon was first described by French naturalist Georges Cuvier in 1829.  Its generic name (Escherichia) is derived from the Latin root furci meaning "forked" and refers to the shape of the animal's feet.  The specific name pardalis refers to the animals' markings, as it is Latin for "leopard" or "spotted like a panther".  The English word chameleon (also chamaeleon) derives from Latin chamaeleō, a borrowing of the Ancient Greek χαμαιλέων (khamailéōn), a compound of χαμαί (khamaí) "on the ground" and λέων (léōn) "lion".  The Greek word is a calque translating the Akkadian nēš qaqqari, "ground lion".  This lends to the common English name of "panther chameleon".

Description
Panther chameleons grow 16-20" (40-51cm) long, with females typically being smaller than males. In a form of sexual dimorphism, males are more vibrantly colored than the females. Coloration varies with location, and the different color patterns of panther chameleons are commonly referred to as 'locales', which are named after the geographical location in which they are found. Panther chameleons from the areas of Nosy Be, Ankify, and Ambanja are typically a vibrant blue, and those from Ambilobe, Antsiranana, and Sambava are red, green or orange. The areas of Maroantsetra and Tamatave yield primarily red specimens.  Numerous other color phases and patterns occur between and within regions. Females generally remain tan and brown with hints of pink, peach, or bright orange, no matter where they are found, but there are slight differences in patterns and colors among the different color phases.

Like all chameleons, panther chameleons exhibit a specialized arrangement of toes. On each foot, the five toes are fused into a group of two and a group of three; these specialized feet allow the panther chameleon a tight grip on narrow branches. Each toe is equipped with a sharp claw to gain traction on surfaces such as bark when climbing. On the forelimbs, there are two toes on the outer (distal) side of each foot and three on the inside (medial). On the hind legs, the arrangement is reversed: two toes are fused medially and three distally. 

Panther chameleons have very long tongues (sometimes longer than their own body length) which they are capable of rapidly extending out of the mouth to capture prey, which is mostly terrestrial invertebrates and very rarely, plant material. Once the tip sticks to a prey item, it is drawn quickly back into the mouth, where the panther chameleon's strong jaws crush it and it is consumed.

Distribution

Range 
Panther chameleons are native to Madagascar; this species is widespread in lowland areas of the eastern and northeastern sections of the country. Additionally, it has been introduced to Réunion and Mauritius.

Habitat 
The panther chameleon lives in regions of rainforest in the east and drier broken forest/savannah in the northwest.  The original primary plant communities within their range has been degraded by human activity; panther chameleons appear to thrive in degraded habitat and are frequently found near roads, homes, and in plantations.

Behavior and ecology 
The panther chameleon is very territorial; aside from mating, it spends the majority of its life in isolation. When two males come into contact, they will change color and inflate their bodies, attempting to assert their dominance. Often these battles end at this stage, with the loser retreating, turning drab and dark colors. Occasionally, the displays result in physical combat if neither contender backs down.

Reproduction

Panther chameleons reach sexual maturity at a minimum age of seven months.

When gravid, or carrying eggs, females turn dark brown or black with orange striping to signify to males they have no intention of mating. Furthermore, females will become very defensive and may bite any advancing males. The exact coloration and pattern of gravid females varies depending on the color phase of the chameleon. This provides a way to distinguish between locales.

Females usually only live two to three years after laying eggs (between five and eight clutches) because of the stress put on their bodies. Females can lay between 10 and 40 eggs per clutch, depending on the food and nutrient consumption during the period of development. Eggs typically hatch in 240 days.

In captivity 
Panther chameleons are occasionally kept as pets due to their striking coloration. While they are easier to care for than many other species of chameleon, panther chameleons are generally considered challenging to keep in captivity. Wild panther chameleons are a short lived species; few animals survive beyond a year of age in the wild. Captive animals may live longer than their wild counterparts; with good care females can live up to 3 years and males can live 5-7 years.

Gallery

References

Further reading

External links
 iNaturalist page

Furcifer
chameleon
chameleon
Reptiles described in 1829
Taxa named by Georges Cuvier
Articles containing video clips